Stanley Edwards (11 December 1942 – February 2014) was an English footballer who played for Everton, Port Vale, and Bangor City.

Career
Edwards began his career at Everton, and played in the 1961 FA Youth Cup final defeat to a Chelsea side that included Ron Harris and Terry Venables. However he never made his first team debut at Goodison Park, and instead signed with Norman Low's Port Vale in May 1961. He played 22 Third Division games in the 1961–62 season, and scored his first goal in the Football League on 17 March, in a 4–0 win over Lincoln City at Vale Park; he also claimed goals against Coventry City and Brentford. In the 1962–63 campaign he scored six goals in 27 league games and two goals in four FA Cup appearances. Despite this reasonable goal return he was transferred to Bangor City in July 1963.

Career statistics
Source:

References

1942 births
2014 deaths
Sportspeople from West Bromwich
English footballers
Association football wingers
Everton F.C. players
Port Vale F.C. players
Bangor City F.C. players
English Football League players